Dick Ivey (15 June 1947 – 22 November 2014) was an  Australian rules footballer who played with North Melbourne in the Victorian Football League (VFL).

Notes

External links 

1947 births
2014 deaths
Australian rules footballers from Victoria (Australia)
North Melbourne Football Club players
Pascoe Vale Football Club players